Struthiolariidae is a family of small to medium-sized sea snails, marine gastropod molluscs in the superfamily Stromboidea.

Genera
Genera within the family Struthiolariidae include:
 Conchothyra Hutton, 1877
 † Monalaria Marwick, 1924
 Pelicaria Gray, 1857
 Perissodonta Martens, 1878
 Struthiolaria Lamarck, 1816
 Tylospira Harris, 1897

References 

 
Stromboidea